Seetharam Koosayya Amin (6 June 1917 – 13 September 1995) was an Indian freedom fighter and Congress politician who was active in the fisherfolk cooperative movement.

Biography
In 1954 he helped establish the Udupi District Co-operative Fish Marketing Federation. In the 1967 Mysore Legislative Assembly election he successfully contested the Udupi constituency with 33.35% of the vote. In the 1972 Assembly election he contested the seat of Mangalore I for the Indian National Congress (Organisation), placing fourth with 14.52% of the vote.  In 1990, he received Karnataka's second highest civilian award, the Rajyotsava Prashasthi, for services to the state's co-operative movement.

References

1917 births
1995 deaths
Mangaloreans
Tulu people
20th-century Indian Muslims
Politicians from Mangalore
Mysore MLAs 1967–1972
Members of the Mysore Legislature